The 1926–27 season was the 53rd season of competitive football by Rangers.

Overview

Results
All results are written with Rangers' score first.

Scottish League Division One

Scottish Cup

Appearances

See also
 1926–27 in Scottish football
 1926–27 Scottish Cup

Scottish football championship-winning seasons
Rangers F.C. seasons
Rangers